Moquilea is a genus of flowering plants belonging to the family Chrysobalanaceae.

Its native range is Mexico to Tropical America.

Species:

Moquilea angustata 
Moquilea anneae 
Moquilea araneosa 
Moquilea belloi 
Moquilea boliviensis 
Moquilea brittoniana 
Moquilea cabrerae 
Moquilea cariae 
Moquilea cecidiophora 
Moquilea celiae 
Moquilea chiriquiensis 
Moquilea chocoensis 
Moquilea corniculata 
Moquilea dodsonii 
Moquilea durifolia 
Moquilea egleri 
Moquilea espinae 
Moquilea fasciculata 
Moquilea filomenoi 
Moquilea fritschii 
Moquilea gentryi 
Moquilea gonzalezii 
Moquilea grandibracteata 
Moquilea guatemalensis 
Moquilea guianensis 
Moquilea hedbergii 
Moquilea imbaimadaiensis 
Moquilea jaramilloi 
Moquilea kallunkiae 
Moquilea klugii 
Moquilea leucosepala 
Moquilea longicuspidata 
Moquilea longipedicellata 
Moquilea longipetala 
Moquilea magnifructa 
Moquilea maranhensis 
Moquilea maritima 
Moquilea megalophylla 
Moquilea minutiflora 
Moquilea montana 
Moquilea palcazuensis 
Moquilea platypus 
Moquilea pyrifolia 
Moquilea salicifolia 
Moquilea salzmannii 
Moquilea silvatica 
Moquilea subarachnophylla 
Moquilea tachirensis 
Moquilea tambopatensis 
Moquilea tomentosa 
Moquilea unguiculata 
Moquilea vasquezii 
Moquilea velata 
Moquilea veneralensis

References

Chrysobalanaceae
Chrysobalanaceae genera